The French 25th Motorized Division was a French Army division active during World War II.

World War 2

Battle Of France 
During the Battle of France in May 1940 the division contained the following units:

38th Infantry Regiment
92nd Infantry Regiment
121st Infantry Regiment
5th Reconnaissance Battalion
16th Artillery Regiment
216th Artillery Regiment

The division was an active division which had existed during peacetime. It was a fully motorized Infantry Division.

References 

25